The  (OPTA) was an independent Dutch government agency charged with enforcing Dutch law on telecommunication, post and cable TV services that operated between 1997 and 2013.  It was set up in 1997 as part of major government changes in the Dutch telecommunication sector and was absorbed by the Netherlands Authority for Consumers and Markets in April 2013.

Headquartered in The Hague it was created to ensure competitiveness in the newly opened Dutch market for telephony and other telecom activities. Prior to 1997, KPN had a monopoly on the Dutch market, but after deregulation, other companies could also enter the market. It was OPTAs responsibility to make sure that KPN would not push the new players out of the market through its sheer size.

The Dutch cable TV network is one of the densest in the world, with over 95 percent of Dutch households having access to cable TV. OPTA also used to regulate this market, and was a mediator in disputes between providers, although OPTA decisions could be appealed in court.

OPTA's function and legal position were similar to the American Federal Communications Commission.

References

External links

 Onafhankelijke Post en Telecommunicatie Autoriteit

Communications in the Netherlands
Defunct government agencies
Communications authorities
Independent government agencies of the Netherlands
Defunct organisations based in the Netherlands
1997 establishments in the Netherlands
Government agencies established in 1997
2013 disestablishments in the Netherlands
Government agencies disestablished in 2013
Telecommunications regulatory authorities
Regulation in the Netherlands